Daniele Proch (born November 8, 1996) is an Italian professional footballer who currently plays as a forward for Caldiero Terme in Italy's Serie D.

Career

College 
Proch played college soccer at Catawba College in 2016. In his one season there he recorded 8 goals and 7 assists in 16 games, he was also named South Atlantic Conference Freshman of the Year.

In 2017, Proch transferred to Duke University, where he scored 28 goals and recorded 9 assists over three seasons with the Blue Devils. In his junior year, he was named to the second team of the NCAA Men's Soccer All-American Team.

Professional
Proch began his soccer career in the academy of U.S. Baone, before joining the academy of F.C. Südtirol, in Italy's Serie C. He spent two years on loan with U.S. Dro in Serie D playing 57 games and scoring 7 goals, before moving to the United States in the summer of 2016.

After going undrafted in the 2020 MLS SuperDraft, Proch signed with North Carolina FC of the USL Championship on February 6, 2020. He made his debut for the side on March 7, 2020, as a substitute in their match against Louisville City FC.

On December 10, 2020, Proch signed with Caldiero Terme of Italy's Serie D.

Personal life
Proch grew up in Arco in northern Italy, before leaving for North Carolina to play collegiate soccer. At Duke, Proch majored in policy journalism and media studies. His brother, Davide, also plays soccer as a forward. He plays for S.S. Benacense in the sixth level of Italian football.

References

1996 births
Association football forwards
Duke Blue Devils men's soccer players
Living people
Italian footballers
North Carolina FC players
U.S. Dro players
USL Championship players